Thinnelapudi is a village in Kota mandel, Nellore district, Andhra Pradesh, India.

References 

Government of Andhra Pradesh, Census of India, 1991: Series 2, Andhra Pradesh, pp. 92, 274, Hyderabad: Government of Andhra Pradesh, 1995 .

Villages in Nellore district